(lit. 'In the Dark Rooms; in the Bright Ones') is a 1976 poetry collection by Finnish poet Bo Carpelan. It won the Nordic Council's Literature Prize in 1977.

References

1976 poetry books
Finnish poetry collections
Nordic Council's Literature Prize-winning works